Diptychis is a genus of moths in the family Geometridae.

References

Ennominae